A ciénega is a type of wetland. 

La Cienega, Ciénega, or Cienaga may also refer to:

Places

United States
 La Cienega, New Mexico, a census-designated place in Santa Fe County
 La Cienega Boulevard, a major arterial road in Los Angeles County, California
La Cienega/Jefferson station, a station on the LA Metro E Line
 Ciénega Creek, an intermittent stream in southern Arizona
 Las Cienegas National Conservation Area, a protected area in Arizona
 Río de la Ciénaga, a river in Puerto Rico
 Ciénaga, Guánica, Puerto Rico, a barrio

Dominican Republic
 La Ciénaga, Barahona, a town in Barahona, Dominican Republic
 La Ciénaga, San José de Ocoa, a town in San José de Ocoa, Dominican Republic
 La Cienega, a neighborhood in the banks of the Ozama River in Santo Domingo, Dominican Republic
 La Cienega de Manabao, Jarabacoa, Dominican Republic a small village known as the entry to José Armando Bermúdez National Park.

Other countries
 Ciénega, Boyacá, a municipality in Márquez Province, Boyacá Department, Colombia
 Ciénaga, Magdalena, a municipality and a town in Magdalena Department, Colombia

Other
 La Ciénaga (film), a 2001 Argentine, Spanish, and French film
 La Ciénega Formation, a geologic formation in Mexico

See also